UDP-GlcNAc:ribostamycin N-acetylglucosaminyltransferase (neoK (gene)) is an enzyme with systematic name UDP-N-acetyl-alpha-D-glucosamine:ribostamycin N-acetylglucosaminyltransferase. This enzyme catalyses the following chemical reaction

 UDP-N-acetyl-alpha-D-glucosamine + ribostamycin  UDP + 2'''-acetyl-6'''-hydroxyneomycin C

Involved in biosynthesis of the aminoglycoside antibiotic neomycin.

References

External links 

EC 2.4.1